The tavluġun is an indigenous Iñupiaq chin tattoo worn by women.

See also
 Kakiniit
 Yidįįłtoo, the traditional face tattoos of the Hän Gwich’in.

References

Inupiat culture
Tattooing traditions
Tattoo designs